Soldatski bal (translation: The Soldiers' Ball) is the first studio album by the Yugoslav band Plavi orkestar, released in 1985. With over 500,000 copies sold, it is the best-selling debut album in Yugoslavia and its successor states.

Recorded during January 1985 and released a few months later, the album was a huge commercial success, spawning numerous hits. It catapulted a band of 21-year-olds to nationwide fame, making them into instant teenage stars.

The album's lyrics are mostly inspired by Saša Lošić's compulsory military service, which he served in Bitola from September 1983 until September 1984. The album features numerous guest appearances, including Nada Obrić, Aki Rahimovski of Parni valjak, Jura Stublić of Film, Peđa D'Boy of Dʼ Boys, Ivan "Firchie" Fece of EKV, Marina Perazić, Dragoš Kalajić, and Jovan Ćirilov.

The album sleeve was designed by Bojan Hadžihalilović. In a replica of The Beatles' Sgt. Pepper's Lonely Hearts Club Band, it shows the four band members flanked by the seven Yugoslav Youth Communist League (SKOJ) secretaries, in addition to 49 individuals from Yugoslav history and public life such as Petar II Petrović-Njegoš, Ivo Lola Ribar, Bata Živojinović, Lepa Brena, Vuk Karadžić, Slavko Štimac, Miroslav Krleža, Oliver Mandić, Mirza Delibašić, etc. In 2015 the album cover was ranked 58th on the list of 100 Greatest Album Covers of Yugoslav Rock published by web magazine Balkanrock.

Track listing

Personnel
Bass guitar — Ćera I
Drums — Ćera II
Drums, vocals — Firči
Engineer — Vladimir Smolec 
Executive producer — Malcolm Muharem 
Guitar, arranged by — Pava
Keyboards — Zoran Kraš
Photography — Mehmed Akšamija
Producer — Husein Hasanefendić
Vocals, voice, arranged by — Saša Lošić
Guest vocal on "Šta će nama šoferima kuća" — Nada Obrić
Guest vocals on "Stambol, Pešta, Bečlija" — Aki Rahimovski, Jura Stublić, and Peđa D'Boy
Backing vocals on "Bolje biti pijan nego star" — Dragoš Kalajić and Jovan Ćirilov

Sound-alike 
Song "Bolje biti pijan nego star" use melody as in "Dok palme nijšu grane" by Dubrovački trubaduri.

References

External links
Soldatski bal at Discogs

1985 debut albums
Plavi orkestar albums